Rawer was an ancient Egyptian official of the Sixth Dynasty of Egypt. His main title was that of a vizier, making him to one of the highest officials at the royal court. Rawer is so far only known from his rather modest mastaba found at Saqqara, close to the pyramid of king Teti. Rawer had several titles, including overseer of Upper Egypt, but also royal sealer and beloved of god.

His mastaba is only 6.83 m long and 4.30 m wide. It contained one room, the offering chapel, with the entrance on the east side. On the west side of the offering chapel are two false doors. All walls are decorated with scenes showing offering bearers and Rawer. There are no family members shown in the chapel. No king's name appears in the tomb. On stylistic grounds, one might date the mastaba to the reign of Pepi I.

References

Literature 

Viziers of the Sixth Dynasty of Egypt
Overseers of Upper Egypt